Yair Raziel Rodríguez Portillo (born October 6, 1992) is a Mexican professional mixed martial artist. He currently competes in the Featherweight division in the Ultimate Fighting Championship (UFC), where he is the current Interim UFC Featherweight Champion. Rodríguez has been with the UFC since 2014 after winning The Ultimate Fighter: Latin America featherweight tournament.

Early life 
Yair Raziel Rodríguez Portillo was born and raised in Parral, Chihuahua, Mexico to Rigoberto Rodríguez Olivas and Norma Alicia Portillo. Rodríguez started Taekwondo at age five.

Mixed martial arts career

Early career
Rodríguez made his professional mixed martial arts (MMA) debut on October 10, 2011, at Mexican Fighter Promotions 8, when he fought Jonatan Guzmán and won via unanimous decision. On March 10, 2012, he fought Carlos Ricardo at The Supreme Cage Fighting 1. He won via third round submission (triangle choke). Rodríguez then fought Luis Roberto Herrera on December 12, 2012, at Mexican Fighter Promotions 13. He lost via first round knockout. Rodríguez next faced Édgar Juárez on February 16, 2013 at Mexican Fighter Promotions 14. He won the fight via first-round knockout. His final fight before he entered the UFC was against Angelo Durante on April 4, 2014, at NP: High Altitude Face Off 6. Rodríguez won the fight via arm-bar in round one.

The Ultimate Fighter
In May 2014, it was revealed that Rodríguez would be a cast member of The Ultimate Fighter: Latin America, competing for "Team Velasquez".

In his first fight on the show, Rodríguez defeated Humberto Brown in the quarterfinals via submission (triangle choke). In the semifinals, Rodríguez defeated Rudolfo Rubio via submission (strikes) to reach the finals.

Ultimate Fighting Championship
Rodríguez made his official UFC debut on November 15, 2014, at UFC 180, facing Leonardo Morales in The Ultimate Fighter: Latin America featherweight finals. Rodríguez defeated Morales via unanimous decision to become the tournament winner.

For his second fight with the promotion, Rodríguez faced Charles Rosa on June 13, 2015, at UFC 188. He won the fight via split decision. Rodríguez received his first Fight of the Night bonus award.

Rodríguez faced Dan Hooker on October 3, 2015, at UFC 192. He won the fight via unanimous decision.

Rodríguez faced Andre Fili on April 23, 2016, at UFC 197. He won the fight via knockout in the second round and was awarded his first Performance of the Night bonus.

Rodríguez faced Alex Caceres on August 6, 2016, at UFC Fight Night 92. He won the fight by split decision. Both participants were awarded Fight of the Night honors.

Rodríguez faced B.J. Penn on January 15, 2017, at UFC Fight Night 103. Rodríguez won the fight via TKO  in the second round. Afterwards, he was awarded a Performance of the Night bonus.

Rodríguez faced Frankie Edgar on May 13, 2017, at UFC 211. He lost the fight via TKO (doctor stoppage) after the second round due to swelling on his left eye.

On May 10, 2018, it was reported that Rodríguez was released from the UFC after allegedly declining two fights. Three weeks later, Rodríguez announced that he and UFC officials worked out their differences and that he was back on the roster.

Rodríguez was expected to face Zabit Magomedsharipov on September 8, 2018, at UFC 228. However, Rodríguez pulled out of the fight on August 23 citing injury.

In late October, Rodríguez agreed to replace Frankie Edgar and fight Chan Sung Jung on November 10, 2018, at UFC Fight Night 139, after Edgar withdrew due to injury. Rodríguez won the fight by knockout via reverse elbow at 4:59 in the fifth round; the latest knockout in UFC history. He was awarded the Fight of the Night and Performance of the Night awards. The knockout went on to win accolades as the knockout of the year from many media sources.

Rodríguez faced Jeremy Stephens on September 21, 2019, in the main event at UFC Fight Night 159. The bout ended in a no contest just 15 seconds into the first round after Rodríguez accidentally swatted Stephens in the left eye, rendering him unable to continue.

Rodríguez faced Jeremy Stephens in a rematch on October 18, 2019, at UFC on ESPN 6. He won the fight via unanimous decision.  This fight earned him the Fight of the Night award.

Rodríguez was scheduled to face Zabit Magomedsharipov on August 29, 2020, at UFC Fight Night 175. However, Rodríguez pulled out with an ankle injury.

On December 3, 2020, UFC anti-doping administrator USADA announced that Rodríguez had been suspended for 6 months, retroactive to September 8, for failing to notify USADA of his whereabouts and being unavailable for drug testing. He became eligible to resume fighting on March 8, 2021.

Rodríguez was scheduled to face Max Holloway on July 17, 2021, at UFC on ESPN 26. Rodríguez's return was delayed once more, as it was reported on June 17, 2021, that Holloway was forced to withdraw from the bout due to injury. The bout was rescheduled on November 13, 2021 at UFC Fight Night 197. Rodríguez lost the fight via unanimous decision. This fight earned him the Fight of the Night award.

Rodríguez faced Brian Ortega on July 16, 2022, at UFC on ABC 3. He won the fight via technical knockout in round one after Ortega suffered a dislocated shoulder, which rendered him unable to continue.

Rodríguez faced Josh Emmett for the Interim UFC Featherweight Championship on February 12, 2023, at UFC 284. He won the fight and title via triangle choke submission in the second round. The win earned him the Performance of the Night award.

Personal life
Rodríguez has one brother and one sister. He is also a cousin of Olympic boxer Misael Rodríguez.

Championships and accomplishments

Mixed martial arts
 Ultimate Fighting Championship
UFC Interim Featherweight Champion (One time, current)
The Ultimate Fighter: Latin America Tournament Winner
 Fight of the Night (Five times) 
 Performance of the Night (Four times) 
 Latest knockout in UFC history (4 minutes 59 seconds of Round 5)
 Tied (Cub Swanson & Max Holloway) for most post-fight bonuses in UFC Featherweight division history (9)
2018 Knockout of the Year vs. Chan Sung Jung
 Mexican Fighters Promotions
 FMP Featherweight Championship (One time)
 MMA Fighting
2018 Knockout of the Year vs. Chan Sung Jung
 MMAJunkie.com
2018 Knockout of the Year vs. Chan Sung Jung
2019 October Fight of the Month vs. Jeremy Stephens
CombatPress.com
2018 Knockout of the Year vs. Chan Sung Jung
MMADNA.nl
2018 Knockout of the Year vs. Chan Sung Jung

Mixed martial arts record

|-
|Win
|align=center|15–3 (1)
|Josh Emmett
|Submission (triangle choke)
|UFC 284
|
|align=center|2
|align=center|4:19
|Perth, Australia 
|
|-
|Win
|align=center|14–3 (1)
|Brian Ortega
|TKO (shoulder injury)
|UFC on ABC: Ortega vs. Rodríguez
|
|align=center|1
|align=center|4:11
|Elmont, New York, United States
|
|-
|Loss
|align=center|13–3 (1)
|Max Holloway
|Decision (unanimous)
|UFC Fight Night: Holloway vs. Rodríguez
|
|align=center|5
|align=center|5:00
|Las Vegas, Nevada, United States
|
|-
|Win
|align=center|13–2 (1)
|Jeremy Stephens
|Decision (unanimous)
|UFC on ESPN: Reyes vs. Weidman
|
|align=center|3
|align=center|5:00
|Boston, Massachusetts, United States
|
|-
|NC
|align=center|
|Jeremy Stephens
|NC (accidental eye poke)
|UFC Fight Night: Rodríguez vs. Stephens
|
|align=center|1
|align=center|0:15
|Mexico City, Mexico
|
|-
|Win
|align=center|12–2
|Jung Chan-sung
|KO (elbow)
|UFC Fight Night: The Korean Zombie vs. Rodríguez
|
|align=center|5
|align=center|4:59
|Denver, Colorado, United States
|
|-
|Loss
|align=center|11–2
|Frankie Edgar
|TKO (doctor stoppage)
|UFC 211
|
|align=center|2
|align=center|5:00
|Dallas, Texas, United States
|
|-
|Win
|align=center|11–1
|B.J. Penn
|TKO (punches)
|UFC Fight Night: Rodríguez vs. Penn
|
|align=center|2
|align=center|0:24
|Phoenix, Arizona, United States
|
|-
|Win
|align=center|10–1
|Alex Caceres
|Decision (split)
|UFC Fight Night: Rodríguez vs. Caceres
|
|align=center|5
|align=center|5:00
|Salt Lake City, Utah, United States
|
|-
|Win
|align=center|9–1
|Andre Fili
|KO (head kick)
|UFC 197
|
|align=center|2
|align=center|2:15
|Las Vegas, Nevada, United States
|
|-
|Win
|align=center|8–1
|Dan Hooker
|Decision (unanimous)
|UFC 192
|
|align=center|3
|align=center|5:00
|Houston, Texas, United States
|
|-
|Win
|align=center|7–1
|Charles Rosa
|Decision (split)
|UFC 188
|
|align=center|3
|align=center|5:00
|Mexico City, Mexico
|
|-
|Win
|align=center|6–1
|Leonardo Morales
|Decision (unanimous)
|UFC 180
|
|align=center|3
|align=center|5:00
|Mexico City, Mexico
|
|-
|Win
|align=center|5–1
|Angelo Duarte
|Submission (armbar)
|NP: High Altitude Face Off 6
|
|align=center|1
|align=center|2:12
|Alamosa, Colorado, United States
|
|-
|Win
|align=center|4–1
|Édgar Juárez
|KO (flying knee)
|Mexican Fighter Promotions 14
|
|align=center|1
|align=center|0:13
|Chihuahua, Mexico
|
|-
|Loss
|align=center|3–1
|Roberto Herrera
|KO (punches)
|Mexican Fighter Promotions 13
|
|align=center| 1
|align=center| 1:21
|Chihuahua, Mexico
|
|-
|Win
|align=center|3–0
|Carlos Ricardo
|Submission (triangle choke)
|The Supreme Cage 1
|
|align=center|3
|align=center|0:50
|Monterrey, Mexico
|
|-
|Win
|align=center|2–0
|Edgar Balderrama
|Submission (rear-naked choke)
|Jueves DIC 22
|
|align=center|1
|align=center|2:13
|Chihuahua, Mexico
|
|-
|Win
|align=center|1–0
|Jonatan Guzmán
|Decision (unanimous)
|Mexican Fighter Promotions 8
|
|align=center|3
|align=center|3:00
|Mexico City, Mexico
|
|-

Mixed martial arts exhibition record

|-
|Win
|align=center|2–0
|Rodolfo Rubio Perez
|TKO (punches)
|The Ultimate Fighter: Latin America
| (airdate)
|align=center|1
|align=center|3:55
|Las Vegas, Nevada
|
|-
|Win
|align=center|1–0
|Humberto Brown Morrison
|Submission (triangle choke)
|The Ultimate Fighter: Latin America
| (airdate)
|align=center|2
|align=center|2:18
|Las Vegas, Nevada
|
|-

Filmography

See also
 List of current UFC fighters
 List of male mixed martial artists

References

External links

Living people
Mexican male mixed martial artists
Mexican male taekwondo practitioners
Featherweight mixed martial artists
Sportspeople from Chihuahua (state)
People from Parral, Chihuahua
1992 births
Mixed martial artists utilizing taekwondo
Mixed martial artists utilizing boxing
Ultimate Fighting Championship male fighters
Ultimate Fighting Championship champions